Balda of Jouarre was the third abbess at Jouarre Abbey in north-central France.  She was a nun at Jourarre for many years, under her nieces Theodichildis and Agilberta, who were abbesses before her.  Her nephew, Agilbert, was bishop of Paris.  She might have been related to Sadalberga.

She succeeded Agilberta in about 680, and "died at a great age in the odour of sanctity".  She is buried in the crypt at Jouarre in one of three well-preserved sarcophagi.  Her feast day is December 9.

References

External links
Benedictine Abbey Notre Dame de Jouarre (in French)

Year of birth unknown
7th-century Christian saints
French women by century
7th-century Frankish people